The Lobedu or Balobedu (also known as the BaLozwi or Bathobolo) are a southern African ethnic group. Their area is called Bolobedu. They are initially known as Bakwebo (wild pigs). The name "balobedu" means "the mineral miners"  lobela / go loba - to mine , their ancestors are part of the great Mapungbuwe early civilization.  They have their own kingdom, the Balobedu Kingdom, within the Limpopo Province of South Africa with a female ruler, the Rain Queen Modjadji.

It is estimated that there is around 1 million BaLobedu in South Africa . Their population is found in Greater Letaba Local Municipality (171 011 or 80.4% - 2011 census), Greater Tzaneen Local Municipality (200 000 or 46% - 2011 census), Ba-Phalaborwa Local Municipality (70 000 or 47% - 2011 census), Greater Giyani Local Municipality (20 000 or 6.4% - 2011 census) and smaller villages of Limpopo. Some are found in Gauteng province as labour migrants, especially in Tembisa and Alexandra townships.

Language

Their language is known as Lobedu (or Khelobedu, KhiLovedu, or Lovedu) and is sometimes considered a dialect of Northern Sotho language. Khelobedu is grammatically similar to other Sotho–Tswana languages.  Mutual intelligibility between these TshiVenda dialects and Khelovedu is so high that speakers of these Venda dialects can effectively communicate with Khelobedu speakers without difficulty. A TshiGuvhu speaker can understand a Khelobedu speaker so easily, or vice versa, Khelobedu could easily have been classified as a Venda dialect or an independent language. For example, Sepedi have a higher mutual intelligibility with Southern Sotho and Setswana than with Khelobedu.

Most Khelobedu speakers only learn to speak Sepedi at school, as such Sepedi is only a second or third language and foreign to them like English and Afrikaans. Khelobedu is a written language. Khilovedu dictionary, THALUSAMANDZWI YA KHILOVEDU was published in 2018 by Kgothatso Seshayi. The first KhiLovedu Novel, LEKHEKHESHA was published in 2018 by Eliya Monyela. The first KhiLovedu poetry book, ZWIRETO ZWA KHELOBEDU was published and launched in 2020 by KhiLovedu poet Makgwekgwe Waa-Mampeule. As of October 2021 a translation of the Christian Bible is being undertaken by VALODAGOMA SOCIETY (BaLobedu think tank) and PANSALB (Pan South African Languages Board).

Subgroups 
There are three sub-groups of the Lobedu:
 Balobedu ba Ga-Modjadji (BaLobedu ba ga Modjadji), which is the main group of BaLobedu and is led by the Royal House of Modjadji, which is the main royal house for the other groups.
 Balobedu ba Ga-Sekgopo (Balobedu Ba Ha Sekhopo), which are located at Ga-Sekgopo Village. They separated from the main group of Balobedu in the late 1700s when the first female ruler of Balobedu was crowned.
 Balobedu ba Ga-Mamaila (BaLobedu ba Ha Mmamaila), which was founded by Prince Mmamaila elder brother of Modjadji I, who objected to being ruled by women. He was one of the eldest sons of the last male rulers of BaLobedu, King Mokodo Mohale of the Royal House of Mohale of BaKwebo as BaLobedu where then known. This tribe is located at around Ga-Mamaila and Sekhosese township an area known as Boroka which means north in Khelovedu.

Origins

The Balobedu originally migrated south from present day Zimbabwe to their present location in South Africa. The central tribal village is Khethakoni in the district of Balobedu. These Kalanga migrants consisted of the Mokwebo, who are the ancestors of all wild pig clans (ba ana golove/ba bina kolobe) like Mamabolo Ramafalo and Modjadji, the Nengwekhulu, who are ancestors of all elephant clans (Ditlou) and the Ramabulana, ancestors of the other elephant clans (Ditlou), are also uncles of the Nengwekhulus. All BaLobedu are descended from these three groups BaKwevho, Nengwekhulu and Ramabulana. The rest of the people are descendants of East Sotho or BaLaudi refugees and indigenous South Venda groups like BaNgona. As a results the most common animal totems among BaLobedu are the wild pig (Goloe/Kolobe) and the elephant (Dou/Tlou).

The wild pig clans (Dikolobe) are the Modjadji, Mohale, Modika, Mahasha,  Mabulana, Mokwebo, Mampeule, Molokwane, Malepe, Sebela, Thobela and Ramafalo all this are descendants of the ancient Mokwebo (wild pig) royal house. All Chiefs in Bolobedu are of the wild pig clans with the exception of the chiefs of Taulome, Malatji and Rakgoale (Mogoboya) who are Dinoko (porcupines). The elephant clan are Rabothata, Selowa (Khelowa/Tshilowa/Shilowa), Shai, Matlou (Ma₫ou), Mabulana and Maenetja, these are the descendants of the ancient royal house of Nengwekhulu.

The BaLobedu are more closely related to the Lozwi Kingdom started by Dlembeu. As they were migrating southward, another splinter went South-East. The Northern Lozwi or Lozi are found in the present day Western province of Zambia. They settled alongside the Zambezi River Banks day establish it as Musi-oa-tunya (storms that thunders), present day Victoria falls. They have the praise lines Sai/Shai and Dewa, and call themselves the people of Thobela, which is the same as the Lozwi/Kalanga. The rainmaking powers of Queen Modjadji are also synonymous with the Njelele Shrine in SiLozwi (in present-day Matabeleland, Zimbabwe) and it is therefore accepted that there is an intertwining of their history with the rest of the Lozwi. Lozwi carry the history of rain making as the current Lozwi king Mike Moyo, who is also gifted with rain making. Linguists have listed Lobedu together with Kalanga, Nambya (a dialect of Kalanga), Venda, Lemba, Shankwe, Nyubi and Karanga, as a language of the Lozwi, and consequently connects them to their history. Their rainmaking history is tied to that of the Banyai in northern Matabeleland and. Kalanga in southern Matabeleland and there are two areas called Njelele in Matabeleland.

Traditions
Balobedu do traditional dances called khekhapa for women and dinaka for men.sekgapa and Dinaka is a traditional dance of same of Bapedi speaking people covering such areas as gaSekhukhune, gaDikgale, gaMaake, gaSekororo and Bolobedu.

Balobedu have a male initiation ceremony called Moroto. The female initiation ceremony is called Dikhopa.

Balobedu have their own way of praising and talking to their God through Dithugula. They sit next to a traditionally designed circle in their homes and start calling the names of their ancestors.

Traditional rulers

The Lobedu have female rulers known as "Rain Queens". The queen is believed to have powers to make rain. The Balobedu Kingdom consists of a number of small groups tied together by their queen. On 12 June 2005, Queen Makobo Modjadji died, leaving no clear successor acceptable to all members of the Queen's Council. The late queen's brother has served as regent since then.

The area of Balobedu consists of around 150 villages and every village has a male or female ruler who represents Modjadji, the Rain Queen.

The Rain Queen was historically known as an extremely powerful magician who was able to bring rain to her friends and drought to her enemies.  Visitors to the area always brought her gifts and tribute, including cattle and their daughters as wives (though their role is more akin to what those in the Western world would call ladies-in-waiting), to appease her so that she would bring rain to their regions. The name Lobedu is thought to derive from this practice, referring to the daughters or sisters who were lost to their families. The Rain Queen extends her influence through her wives, because they link her politically to other families or villages.

The Rain Queen was referenced in literature as a basis for H. Rider Haggard's novel She.

List of rulers of Balobedu 
 Queen Maselekwane Modjadji I (1800-1854) 
 Queen Masalanabo Modjadji II (1854-1894) 
 Queen Khesethoane Modjadji III (1895-1959) 
 Queen Makoma Modjadji IV (1959-1980) 
 Queen Mokope Modjadji V (1981-2001) 
 Queen Makobo Modjadji VI (2003-2005) 
 Prince Regent Mpapada Modjadji (2007-2021) 
 King in waiting Lekukela Modjadji (2021)

Notable people 
 Stanley Kgatla, former Platinum Stars defender; born in GaRamotshinyadi Village 
 Candy Tsa Mandebele, musician
 Lebogang Manyama, Cape Town City FC midfielder
 Andrew Rabutla, former Bafana Bafana and Jomo Cosmos defender; born in GaRamotshinyadi Village
 Tebogo Monyai, former Black Aces, Moroka Swallows and University of Pretoria FC defender; born in Ga-Abel village
 Makoma Makhuruptjie, from Ga-Ramotshinyadi Village.
 Peta Teanet, born Teanet Peta XiTsonga Disco musician, born and raised at Thapane Village in Bolobedu.
 Forster Teanet, XiTsonga Disco musician,born and raised at Thapane Village in Bolobedu.
 Mathole motshekga, South African Polotician and former premier of Gauteng province.
Khutso Steven Kgatla popularly as King Monada , a musician and pioneer  of BoloHouse (Bolobedu house Music)winner of song of the year in 2016 and 2022.
Solly Mapaila , South African polotician and leader of the Communist Party ally to the ruling party.
Rali Mampeule , Prominent Business Man and Real Estste Mogul.

Further reading
Krige, E. Jensen and J. D. Krige. The Realm of a Rain-Queen: A Study of the Pattern of Lovedu Society.  London: Oxford University Press, 1943.

External links
"Bantu", GovernPub.com.
Seleti, Yonah. Turning Points, SouthAfricanHistoryOnline.
"The Balobedu of Modjadji".
The Lobedu: A North Sotho Tribe

Sotho-Tswana peoples in South Africa
Northern Sotho
Monarchies of South Africa